The Rambler is a 2013 American independent horror film written and directed by Calvin Reeder.

The film's narrative concerns a mysterious loner known only as the Rambler, played by Dermot Mulroney. Newly released from prison, he embarks on a dark journey across a bleak and strange contemporary landscape, meeting a bizarre cast of characters.

Plot

Cast

 Dermot Mulroney as The Rambler
 Lindsay Pulsipher as The Girl
 Natasha Lyonne as Cheryl
 James Cady as The Scientist

Release

The Rambler was premiered at the 2013 Sundance Film Festival, and subsequently screened within such festivals as South by Southwest and Maryland Film Festival.

Home media
The film was released on DVD and Blu-ray by Lionsgate and Starz/Anchor Bay on June 25, 2013.

Reception

On Metacritic, which assigns a rating to reviews, the film has a weighted average score of 32 out of 100, based on 6 critics, indicating "generally unfavorable reviews".

Amy Nicholson from LA Times gave the film a negative review, writing "What all of this means is, frankly, nothing. But it's a handsome nothing, at least until you get sick of the screaming." Justin Lowe from The Hollywood Reporter called the film "Misguided exercise in genre fetishism", criticizing the film's plot, cheap special-effects, and performances. 
Drew Hunt from Slant Magazine gave the film a positive review, writing, "Like Inland Empire, essentially a three-hour reel of David Lynch’s nightmares, the film is anchored in the sort of dream logic that may only make complete sense to its creator. Reeder’s dogged refusal to allow even the smallest semblance of standard movie comforts—likeable characters, narrative logic, easily identifiable themes—to worm their way into the film may be hubristic, but by that same token, it’s refreshing and revitalizing to watch someone assertively rattle the cages of cinematic form. After all, there’s more than one way to tell a story."

References

External links
 
 
 
 

2013 films
2013 horror films
2010s road movies
American avant-garde and experimental films
American mystery horror films
American independent films
American road movies
2010s mystery horror films
2010s avant-garde and experimental films
2010s English-language films
2010s American films